is a Japanese voice actress and singer represented by I'm Enterprise. She is a graduate of Kobe College's department of General Culture.
She is best known as the voices of Yumi Fukuzawa in Maria-sama ga Miteru, Rin Tōsaka in Fate/stay night, Hayate Yagami in Magical Girl Lyrical Nanoha A's and Magical Girl Lyrical Nanoha Strikers, and Rachel Alucard in BlazBlue. Ueda was raised in Osaka Prefecture and is known for her strong Kansai accent in some of her roles.

Filmography

Television animation

2001
Angelic Layer (Ringo Seto)
Chance Pop Session (Jun Morimura)
Cyborg 009 (Cyborg 001/Ivan Wisky)
Final Fantasy: Unlimited (Herba)
Great Dangaioh (Ryoko Sugi)

2002
Samurai Deeper Kyo (Antera, Saisei)

2003
Green Green (Reika Morimura)
Mermaid Melody Pichi Pichi Pitch (Sara)
Tsukihime (Kohaku)
Wandaba Style (Yuri Fuyude)

2004
Burst Angel (Yoko)
Daphne in the Brilliant Blue (Shizuka Hayama)
Doki Doki School Hours (Minako Tominaga)
Gakuen Alice (Mikan Sakura, Amanatsu)
Kannazuki no Miko (Korona, Orochi)
Kujibiki Unbalance (Lisa Humvee)
Maria-sama ga Miteru (Yumi Fukuzawa)
Maria-sama ga Miteru: Printemps (Yumi Fukuzawa)
Melody of Oblivion (Kyu-chan)
Mermaid Melody Pichi Pichi Pitch Pure (Sara)
Ragnarok the Animation (Lisa)
Tactics (Edogawa Miyako)
The Marshmallow Times (Jasmine, Pansy)
Uta Kata (Minami)

2005
Best Student Council (Kotoha Kutsugi, Fake Maachi)
He Is My Master (Anna Kurauchi)
Hell Girl (Mayumi Hashimoto)
Loveless (Yuiko Hawatari)
Magical Girl Lyrical Nanoha A's (Hayate Yagami)
Rockman.EXE Stream (Pink Bunny)
Pani Poni Dash! (Kurumi Momose)
Petopeto-san (Petoko (Hatoko Fujimura))

2006
Ballad of a Shinigami (Yutaka Fujishima)
Chocotto Sister (Hideko Hasuki)
Fate/stay night (Rin Tōsaka)
Gin Tama (Hanako)
Glass Fleet (Aimel)
Majime ni Fumajime Kaiketsu Zorori (Cinderella)
Kashimashi: Girl Meets Girl (Hazumu Osaragi)
Ryusei no Rockman (Luna Shirogane)
Pokémon: Battle Frontier (Luna)
Pumpkin Scissors (Sergeant Stekkin, Claymore One Member/Fransisca)
Tactical Roar (Sango Fukami)
Tokko (Suzuka Kureha)

2007
Fantastic Detective Labyrinth (Hatsumi Mieno, Sōka)
Gurren Lagann (Kinon Bachika)
Hayate the Combat Butler (Sakuya Aizawa)
Hitohira (Haruko Tamashiro)
Kaze no Stigma (Misao Ōgami)
Kotetsushin Jeeg (Tsubaki Tamashiro)
Magical Girl Lyrical Nanoha StrikerS (Hayate Yagami)
Majin Tantei Nōgami Neuro (Yako Katsuragi)
Major (Third Season) (Miho Nakamura)
Ryusei no Rockman Tribe (Luna Shirogane)
Night Wizard The ANIMATION (Azel Iblis)
Pururun! Shizuku-Chan (Ichigo)
Rental Magica (Honami Takase Ambler, White Tiger)
Strawberry 100% (Kozue Mukai)
Sugarbunnies (Sophia Cherbourg, Buchiusa)
The Galaxy Railways (Frel)
Tokyo Majin Gakuen Kenpuchō: Tō (Marie Claire)
Tokyo Majin Gakuen Kenpuchō: Tō Dai Ni Maku (Second Act) (Marie Claire)
Zombie-Loan (Koyomi Yoimachi, Yomi)

2008
Kure-nai (Lin Cheng-Shin)
Linebarrels of Iron (Shizuna Endo)
Nogizaka Haruka no Himitsu (Nanami Nanashiro)
Sekirei (Yomi)
Shigofumi: Letters from the Departed (Fumika)
Sugarbunnies: Chocolat! (Sophia Cherbourg, Buchiusa)
Telepathy Shōjo Ran (Midori Naha)
Toshokan Sensō (Marie Nakazawa)
Tytania (Laetitia)

2009
Atashin'chi (Ōnishi)
A Certain Scientific Railgun (Mii Konori)
Hayate the Combat Butler (Sakuya Aizawa)
Kämpfer (Rika Ueda)
Maria-sama ga Miteru 4th Season (Yumi Fukuzawa)
Nogizaka Haruka no Himitsu: Pure Rezza (Nanami Nanashiro, Nanao)
Saki (Saki Miyanaga)
Sugarbunnies: Fleur (Sophia Cherbourg, Buchiusa, Narration)
Taishō Baseball Girls (Noe Kawashima)
Tears to Tiara (Rathty)
Viper's Creed (Chris)

2010
Kaichō wa Maid-sama! (Subaru)
Sound of the Sky (Yukiko)
Tegami Bachi Reverse (Celica)
Uragiri wa Boku no Namae o Shitteiru (Ashley)

2011
Bunny Drop (Haruko Maeda)
Fate/Zero (Rin Tōsaka)
Freezing (Attia Simmons)
Heaven's Memo Pad (Kayo Fujishima)
Kaitō Tenshi Twin Angel (Yuriko Barakoji)
Kämpfer fur die Liebe (Rika Ueda)
Yumekui Merry (Chizuru Kawanami)

2012
Accel World (Akira Himi/Aqua Current)
Aesthetica of a Rogue Hero (Chikage Izumi)
AKB0048 (Tomoyo Itano/Tomomi Itano The 11th)
Cardfight!! Vanguard: Asia Circuit (Jillian Chen)
Fate/Zero 2nd Season (Rin Tōsaka)
Girls und Panzer (Momo Kawashima)
Hayate no Gotoku! (Sakuya Aizawa)
Hunter × Hunter (2011) (Neon Nostrade)
Muv-Luv: Total Eclipse (Kazusa Yamashiro)
Pocket Monsters: Best Wishes! (Skyla)
Saki Achiga-hen Episode of Side-A (Saki Miyanaga)
Sengoku Collection (Ageha)
Thermae Romae (Yamaguchi)

2013
AKB0048 Next Stage (Tomoyo Itano/Tomomi Itano The 11th)
A Certain Scientific Railgun S (Mii Konori)
BLAZBLUE Alter Memory (Rachel Alucard)
Cardfight!! Vanguard: Link Joker (Jillian Chen)
Detective Conan (Hikaru Hibara)
Fate/kaleid liner Prisma Illya (Rin Tōsaka)
Hayate the Combat Butler: Cuties (Sakuya Aizawa)
Hyperdimension Neptunia (IF)
Pokémon Smash! (Luna)
Stella Women’s Academy, High School Division Class C³ (Aoi Seto)
Strike the Blood (Koyomi Shizuka/Paper Noise)
Tanken Driland: Sennen no Mahō (Sara)
Yuyushiki (Aikawa's Mother)

2014
Atelier Escha & Logy: Alchemists of the Dusk Sky (Marion)
Cardfight!! Vanguard: Legion Mate (Jillian Chen)
D-Frag! (Tama Sakai)
Saki Zenkoku-hen (Saki Miyanaga)
Fate/Kaleid liner Prisma Illya 2wei! (Rin Tōsaka)
Fate stay night: Unlimited Blade Works (Rin Tōsaka)

2015
Aoharu x Machinegun (Hanako Sagara)
Assassination Classroom (Yuzuki Fuwa)
Bikini Warriors (Paladin)
Fate/Kaleid liner Prisma Illya 2wei! Herz! (Rin Tōsaka)
Fate/stay night: Unlimited Blade Works 2nd Season (Rin Tōsaka)
Gangsta. (Loretta Cristiano Amodio)
Gunslinger Stratos (Sidune Rindo)
Magical Girl Lyrical Nanoha ViVid (Hayate Yagami)
One Piece (Lammy)

2016
Assassination Classroom 2nd Season (Yuzuki Fuwa)
D.Gray-man Hallow (Klaud Nine)
Haven't You Heard? I'm Sakamoto (Mī-chan)
Luck & Logic (Pieri Saotome)
Fate/kaleid liner Prisma Illya 3rei!! (Rin Tōsaka)
Handa-kun (Tsugumi)
Re:Zero -Starting Life in Another World- (Anastasia Hoshin)

2017
Idol Memories (Maybell Takasaki)
Hina Logi ~from Luck & Logic~ (Yūko Morigaya)

2018
Citrus (Ume Aihara)
Fate/Extra Last Encore (Rin Tōsaka)

2019
Fate/Grand Order - Absolute Demonic Front: Babylonia (Ishtar, Ereshkigal)
Demon Slayer: Kimetsu no Yaiba (Mukago)

2020
A Certain Scientific Railgun T (Mii Konori)
Black Clover (Undine)

2021
Dr. Ramune: Mysterious Disease Specialist (Ayame)
Battle Athletes Victory ReSTART! (Tamami Yanagida)
86 (Grethe Wenzel)

2022
Princess Connect! Re:Dive Season 2 (Kurumi)

Original video animation (OVA)

2004
Daphne in the Brilliant Blue (Shizuka Hayama)
Doki Doki School Hours (Minako Tominaga)

2009
Aki Sora (Nami Aoi)
Denpa teki na Kanojo (Kaori Shiraishi)
Hayate the Combat Butler (Sakuya Aizawa)

2010
A Certain Scientific Railgun (Mii Konori)

2021
Hori-san to Miyamura-kun (Yuki Yoshikawa)

Unsorted
Fate/kaleid liner Prisma Illya series (Rin Tōsaka)
Final Fantasy: Unlimited PhaSE.0 (Herba)
Girls und Panzer series (Momo Kawashima)
He Is My Master Emergency Dispatch (Anna Kurauchi)
Kujibiki Unbalance (Lisa Humvee)
Kure-nai (Lin Cheng-Shin)
Kyō no Go no Ni (Megumi Hidaka)
Maria-sama ga Miteru (Yumi Fukuzawa)
Master of Martial Hearts (Ryu Getsurei)
Nogizaka Haruka no Himitsu Finale (Nanami Nanashiro)
Pani Poni Dash! (Kurumi Momose)
Saki Biyori (Saki Miyanaga)
Shigofumi: Letters from the Departed (Fumika)
Strawberry 100% (Kozue Mukai)
Strike Witches: Operation Victory Arrow (Heidemarie W. Schnaufer)
Sylvanian Families (Shima Neko)
Wandaba Style (Yuri Fuyude)

Theatrical animation

2008
Gurren Lagann the Movie: Childhood's End (Kinon Bachika)

2009
Gurren Lagann the Movie: The Lights in the Sky are Stars (Kinon Bachika)

2010
Fate/stay night: Unlimited Blade Works (Rin Tōsaka)

2011
Hayate the Combat Butler! Heaven Is a Place on Earth (Sakuya Aizawa)

2012
Strike Witches: The Movie (Heidemarie W. Schnaufer)
Magical Girl Lyrical Nanoha The Movie 2nd A's (Hayate Yagami)

2013
Hunter × Hunter: The Last Mission (Neon Nostrade)

2015
Girls und Panzer der Film (Momo Kawashima)

2017
Fate/stay night: Heaven's Feel I. presage flower (Rin Tōsaka)
Girls und Panzer das Finale: Part 1  (Momo Kawashima)
Magical Girl Lyrical Nanoha Reflection (Hayate Yagami, Dearche)

2018
Magical Girl Lyrical Nanoha Detonation (Hayate Yagami, Dearche)

2019
Fate/stay night: Heaven's Feel II. lost butterfly (Rin Tōsaka)
Girls und Panzer das Finale: Part 2 (Momo Kawashima)

2020
Fate/stay night: Heaven's Feel III. spring song (Rin Tōsaka)

2021
 Girls und Panzer das Finale: Part 3 (Momo Kawashima)

Web anime
7SEEDS (Mayu)
Koro-sensei Q! (Yuzuki Fuwa, Yako Katsuragi)
Maria-sama no Oshirase (Yumi Fukuzawa)
Sailor Moon Crystal (Princess Dia)

Drama CD

2006
 Pani Poni Dash! (Kurumi Momose) – Drama CD 1 and 2

2008
 Hayate the Combat Butler (Sakuya Aizawa) – Drama CD 3
 Nogizaka Haruka no Himitsu (Nanami Nanashiro) – Drama CD 1 and 2

Unsorted
Needless (Setsuna)
Tonari no 801-chan (801-chan)
Vampire Knight (Sayori Wakaba)
Working!! (Aoi Yamada)

Vomic
Beelzebub (Hildegarde)

Video games
Alchemy Stars (Nadine, Nikinis)
Aquapazza: Aquaplus Dream Match (Rathy)
Arknights (Skyfire)
ASH: Archaic Sealed Heat (Maritie)
BlazBlue series (Rachel Alucard)   
Disgaea 2: Cursed Memories (Yukimaru, Asagi)
Dragalia Lost (Ezelith, Althemia)
Ever 17: The Out of Infinity (Sara Matsunaga)
Fate series (Rin Tōsaka)
Fate/Grand Order (Ishtar, Ereshkigal, "Space Ishtar")
Genshin Impact (Yoimiya)
Girls' Frontline (Howa Type 64, X95)
GIRLS und PANZER: Sensha-dou, Kiwamemasu! (Momo Kawashima)
GIRLS und PANZER: Dream Tank Match (Momo Kawashima)
Granblue Fantasy (Yuel)
 Grand Chase: Dimensional Chaser (Rasel Coriander)
Guardian Tales (Loraine)
Gunslinger Stratos series (Sidune Rindo)
Hyperdimension Neptunia series (If)
Magia Record (Arisa Narumi, Hayate Yagami)
Magical Girl Lyrical Nanoha A's Portable: The Battle of Aces (Hayate Yagami, Dearche)
Magical Girl Lyrical Nanoha A's Portable: The Gears of Destiny (Hayate Yagami, Dearche)
Mahjong Soul (Fu Ji)
Master of Martial Hearts (Ryu Getsurei)
Naraka: Bladepoint (Matari)
Princess Connect Re:Dive (Kurumi/Kurumi Kuribayashi)
Queen's Gate: Spiral Chaos (Alice)
Record of Agarest War (Ellis)
Sdorica (Izumi, Izumi SP, Izumi MZ)
Shadowverse (Yuel the Ancient, Flower Princess, Beauty and the Beast, Kunoichi Master, Shadow Witch, Ceres of the Night, Labyrinth Devil) 
Star Ocean: First Departure (Erys Jerand)
Street Fighter V (Ibuki)
Summon Night 5 (Cyda)
Summon Night: Swordcraft Story 2 (Area)
Summon Night: Twin Age (Reiha)
Tales of Graces (Pascal)
The Legend of Heroes: Kuro no Kiseki II – Crimson Sin (Lucrezia Isselee)
Touhou Lost Word (Hatate Himekaidou)
Two Jong Cell!! (Misuto Hisame)
Valkyrie Connect (Valkyrie Urd, Mecha-Fist Sif and  Others)
Witch Weapon (Beth, Henriette Khunrath)

Dubbing

Live Action
Gilmore Girls (Christine)
Monk (Lisa)
Richie Rich (Darcy)
The Thundermans (Darcy Wong)

Animation
44 Cats (Milady)
The Backyardigans (Tasha)
Peppa Pig (Peppa Pig)
Star vs. the Forces of Evil (Star Butterfly)

Discography

Singles
 "Over the Fantasy" (December 5, 2001); opening theme song of Final Fantasy: Unlimited
 "Kirby★March" (December 16, 2001); opening theme song of Kirby of the Stars
 "First You Draw a Circle" (December 16, 2001); ending theme song of Kirby of the Stars
 "Earth's Merry-Go-Round" (September 25, 2003) 
 "Netsuretsu Kangei Wonderland" (May 27, 2009); (Saki ending theme, with Rie Kugimiya, Ami Koshimizu, Ryōko Shiraishi and Shizuka Itō)
 "Ding Dong Holy Night♪" (January 30, 2019); Princess Connect Re:Dive character song, with Yu Serizawa

Albums
 Kanairo (August 25, 2004)

Notes

References

External links
  
 
 

1980 births
Living people
Anime musicians
I'm Enterprise voice actors
Japanese women pop singers
Japanese video game actresses
Japanese voice actresses
Musicians from Nara Prefecture
Musicians from Osaka Prefecture
People from Higashiōsaka
Video game musicians
Voice actresses from Nara Prefecture
Voice actresses from Osaka Prefecture
21st-century Japanese women singers
21st-century Japanese singers